Anthony Henday Drive (Highway 216) is a  freeway that encircles Edmonton, Alberta. It is a heavily travelled commuter and truck bypass route with the southwest quadrant serving as a portion of the CANAMEX Corridor that links Canada to the United States and Mexico.  Henday is one of the busiest highways in Western Canada, carrying over 108,000 vehicles per day in 2019 at its busiest point near West Edmonton Mall. Rush hour congestion is common on the four-lane section in southwest Edmonton, where traffic levels have risen due to rapid suburban development. Work began in fall 2019 to widen this section to six lanes by the end of 2022.

Calgary Trail in south Edmonton is designated as the starting point of the ring, with exit numbers increasing clockwise as the freeway proceeds across the North Saskatchewan River to the Cameron Heights neighbourhood, then north past Whitemud Drive, Stony Plain Road and Yellowhead Trail to St. Albert.  It continues east past 97 Street to Manning Drive, then south across the North Saskatchewan River a second time.  Entering Strathcona County, it again crosses Yellowhead Trail and Whitemud Drive, passing the community of Sherwood Park.  Continuing south to Highway 14, the road re-enters southeast Edmonton and turns west to complete the ring.

Late in its planning the freeway was named after English explorer Anthony Henday, who historians believe was one of the first Europeans to visit Edmonton.  Its designation of 216 is derived from its bypass linkages to Edmonton's two major crossroads, Highways 2 and 16.  Constructed over 26 years at a cost of $4.3 billion, Henday became the first freeway to surround a major Canadian city when the final segment opened on October 1, 2016.  Planning of the ring began in the 1950s, followed by design work and initial land acquisition in the 1970s, and opening of the first expressway segment in 1990.  Plans for Henday were developed in tandem with Stoney Trail, a similar ring road freeway around Calgary.

Route description

Overview
The majority of Capital Region residents reside within the approximate  diameter of the ring and there is extensive suburban development in close proximity to Henday. By physical size, Edmonton is larger than both Toronto and Montreal, but has a relatively low population density. Some have argued that the freeway is a significant contributor to urban sprawl in the region. The city also lacks a free-flowing north–south route, further increasing traffic levels on Anthony Henday Drive.

The road travels primarily through suburban residential areas in the south and west of the city, and rural farm lands and wetlands in the north.  The eastern section of the road separates the Sherwood Park portion of Refinery Row and other industrial and commercial developments in Edmonton to the west, from the balance of Sherwood Park to the east.  At its widest point east of Edmonton between Whitemud Drive and Sherwood Park Freeway, Anthony Henday Drive is eight total lanes wide which includes three main travel lanes in each direction plus a fourth lane allowing traffic to merge onto and exit from the roadway.  The highest number of through lanes is seven, between Aurum Road and 153 Avenue in northeast Edmonton.  Most of the road is paved with asphalt, except for an experimental  concrete segment in southwest Edmonton, the first of its type in the province.  Alberta Transportation intended for the section to have lower long-term maintenance costs, but only six years after construction it required significant repairs. Concrete was not considered for subsequent sections of the road, but overall it was deemed to be a successful experiment that would net long term savings.

West and north Edmonton

Alberta Transportation considers the starting point of Anthony Henday Drive to be at Calgary Trail / Gateway Boulevard in south Edmonton, with mileage increasing clockwise around the ring. At this major interchange, two westbound lanes of the freeway are joined by two lanes from northbound Gateway Boulevard and a third from southbound Calgary Trail. All five lanes merge into two over a short distance, creating congestion in the afternoon rush hour. Two westbound lanes continue across Blackmud Creek past 111 Street to 119 Street. Curving slightly to the southwest through the suburbs of south Edmonton, Henday crosses Whitemud Creek to an interchange at Rabbit Hill Road. Veering back to the northwest, the freeway passes beneath Terwillegar Drive before descending to cross the North Saskatchewan River on twin  bridges.

West of the river, the four lane freeway passes Maskêkosihk Trail and Cameron Heights Drive on its way to Lessard Road and Callingwood Road.  Curving north, traffic volume increases as the freeway reaches a major interchange at Whitemud Drive and widens to six lanes.  A northbound braided ramp helps reduce congestion between Whitemud Drive and 87 Avenue, with which an interchange immediately follows. Henday continues north to major interchanges at Stony Plain Road and Yellowhead Trail, providing access to Spruce Grove and Jasper respectively, before curving northeast toward the city of St. Albert.  Between Whitemud Drive and Yellowhead Trail, Henday is officially concurrent with Highway 2, but this is not indicated on any road signs.

In northwest Edmonton, Anthony Henday Drive first crosses Ray Gibbon Drive before continuing northeast to pass St. Albert to the southeast.  After Ray Gibbon Drive, the freeway serves as the boundary between the cities of Edmonton and St. Albert. The six lane road continues over 137 Avenue and under 170 Street to Campbell Road where it reduces from three lanes each way to two.  It continues curving east across 127 Street to Highway 28, the most northerly point on the ring road. Now forming the approximate boundary between Edmonton and Sturgeon County, the freeway passes south of CFB Edmonton before reaching 66 Street and a major interchange at Manning Drive/Highway 15, the former terminus of the freeway until the final section was completed in 2016.

East and south Edmonton
After Manning Drive, the freeway widens to six lanes and continues clockwise through northeast Edmonton past 153 Avenue to a second crossing of the North Saskatchewan River.  Four lanes cross the river southbound and three northbound on  bridges.  A pedestrian crossing was again included; it is slung underneath the southbound bridge and ties into the existing pathway system. The seven lane freeway rises from the river valley into the Clover Bar area, crossing Aurum Road to a major interchange at Yellowhead Trail, crossing into Strathcona County.

In Strathcona County, the fourth southbound lane is dropped and the six lane freeway immediately crosses over Petroleum Way en route to interchanges at Baseline Road and Sherwood Park Freeway, passing Refinery Row to the east.  South of Sherwood Park Freeway, Anthony Henday Drive forms the boundary between Strathcona County and the city of Edmonton.  The freeway continues to a second interchange at Whitemud Drive after which it is briefly concurrent with Highway 14 until that route branches southeast  later.  Four lanes of Anthony Henday Drive re-enter the city of Edmonton and turns west toward the starting point of the loop. Before straightening out to a westerly heading, the freeway interchanges with 17 Street, then 50 Street after which it returns to a six lane freeway, crosses 91 Street, and returns to its starting point at Calgary Trail/Gateway Boulevard.

Interchange design
Alberta Transportation used several different interchange designs for the freeway, the most common being the partial cloverleaf, with between four and six ramps. This type of interchange is ideal for connections between freeways and arterial roads; they have a higher capacity than diamond interchanges, but do not have the weaving and merging problems of full cloverleaf interchanges. Loop ramps are also used to better conform to existing terrain or structures, or to increase merge/weave distances between closely spaced interchanges. For example, they were used at 91 Street to achieve at least  of separation to Gateway Boulevard, which would not have been possible with a conventional diamond.

Anthony Henday Drive features several variations of the combination interchange, a common name for hybrid designs that allow for high speed left turns on elevated or depressed directional ramps. They retain loop ramps for the lesser used left turn movements which significantly reduced the cost and overall size of the interchange because fourth level flyovers are not required as they are in a stack interchange. Henday features two three-level interchanges; the one at Calgary Trail / Gateway Boulevard was the first three-level interchange to be constructed in Alberta. Several of the bridges in this interchange use a "Trellis Beam" concept in which many perpendicular girders are used to carry the upper roadway at a high degree of skew. Anthony Henday Drive's junction with the Yellowhead Highway east of Edmonton was reconstructed  with two new two semi-directional flyovers and one loop ramp for the eastbound to northbound movement. The existing semi-directional ramp for the westbound to southbound movement that runs parallel to the railway line that bisects the interchange, which opened prior to the completion of the northeast leg of Anthony Henday Drive, has been retained in the reconfigured interchange.

Traffic
The busiest section of Anthony Henday Drive is in west Edmonton between 87 Avenue and Stony Plain Road where it carried over 108,000 vehicles per day in 2019, second only to Whitemud Drive among Edmonton roadways.  The section carried over 115,000 vehicles per day during the summer months of 2019.  The 4-lane section of the southwest quadrant between Calgary Trail and Whitemud Drive is significantly over capacity and sees major delays during peak periods.  A contributing factor is the close proximity of interchanges between the North Saskatchewan River and Yellowhead Trail, which creates a problem known as "weaving" in which traffic is trying to simultaneously enter and exit within the same stretch of roadway.

Traffic levels on Henday have risen much more quickly than anticipated.  Alberta Transportation concedes that in 2001 the southwest section was projected to reach 40,000 vehicles per day by 2020 but reached that mark in 2009.  it carries over 80,000 vehicles per day in the vicinity of 111 Street, and Alberta committed to widening the section to six lanes by 2022 with work planned to have begun in fall 2019. Prior to the announcement, project manager Bill van der Meer had stated that Henday is operating efficiently, aside from peak hour congestion.  Alberta Transportation generally considers widening four lane highways when volumes reach between 30,000 and 50,000 cars per day. With the exception of a section in north Edmonton between Highway 28 and Manning Drive, by 2015, all four-lane sections of Henday each carried more than 40,000 vehicles per day.

Traffic volumes

Alberta Transportation publishes yearly traffic volume data for provincial highways. The table below compares the average daily vehicle count over the span of a year (annual average daily traffic, AADT) at several locations along Anthony Henday Drive using data from 2000, 2010 and 2015.

Lane count

History

Early plans 

The road is named after Isle of Wight explorer Anthony Henday, who travelled up the North Saskatchewan River to the area now known as Edmonton in the 18th century on a mission for the Hudson's Bay Company.  Plans for a ring road around Edmonton began developing in the 1950s when the Edmonton Regional Planning Commission identified a need for the road to support future development in the Edmonton area, and the movement of goods and services around the province.  Areas around the city that could potentially interfere with this growth were retained by the province and called Restricted Development Areas.  In 1972, Edmonton City Council recommended that the city ask for the province to pay for the ring road. Shortly thereafter, in addition to the Restricted Development Areas that had already been retained, the Alberta government led by Premier Peter Lougheed continued land acquisitions to assemble a transportation utility corridor (TUC) for Edmonton and Calgary ring roads. Plans had evolved to provide right of way for future overhead high-voltage transmission lines, underground gas and oil pipelines, and water/storm sewer lines. By 1985, a study had been completed to plot an exact alignment of Anthony Henday Drive through the TUC and by the end of the decade most of the required land had been purchased from land owners.  Unused land within the corridor may be leased out by the government as a source of revenue, but some landowners were unhappy that the province did not have a firm timeline for Henday's construction.

South construction
The southwest quadrant of Anthony Henday Drive bypasses Edmonton to the southwest, connecting Highways 2 and 16.  It was deemed to be the highest priority for construction because of its designation as part of the CANAMEX Corridor, a trade route through Alberta that links Alaska to Mexico.  The first section of the bypass to be completed was from Whitemud Drive north to Stony Plain Road, constructed by the City of Edmonton beginning in 1990 and completed in 1992 prior to the province taking over responsibility of Henday.  An additional  extending the road north to Yellowhead Trail was completed by 1998.

Construction then shifted south, with completion from Whitemud Drive south to 45 Avenue just north of what is currently the Lessard Road interchange. The next section extended the road on twin bridge structures across the North Saskatchewan River to Terwillegar Drive, opening on November 8, 2005. In December 2003, during construction of the southbound bridge, a girder collapsed and had to be replaced, delaying construction. An extension further east to Calgary Trail was completed by October 2006, creating a full southwest bypass of Edmonton. It includes a semi-circular arch structure that spans Whitemud Creek, and three arch bridges over Blackmud Creek. A $168 million interchange that included seven bridges was constructed at Stony Plain Road, and the entire quadrant became free-flowing in late 2011 after the completion of smaller interchanges at Lessard Road, Callingwood Road, and Cameron Heights Drive. A flyover was originally planned on the western leg at 69 Avenue before it was ultimately scrapped by Alberta Transportation.

In 2003, Alberta began design work for the  southeastern section from Gateway Boulevard to Highway 14.  Unlike the southwest portion, the province announced its intention to construct the road via a public-private partnership (P3), also known as a design-build-operate project.  This method of construction presented millions of dollars in savings to Alberta taxpayers, and allowed the project to be completed on an accelerated timeline because the consolidation of various sub-contracts is managed by one entity allowing for increased efficiencies.  On January 25, 2005, Alberta signed a $493 million contract with a consortium called Access Roads to build the road and maintain it for 30 years. Construction began in April and was completed in October 2007.  The new segment included 24 bridge structures and 5 interchanges, and connected Highway 14 to Yellowhead Trail in the west effectively creating a full southern bypass of Edmonton.  It also provided an important link for the quickly growing southern communities of Ellerslie and Summerside to the rest of Edmonton's road network.

North construction and completion 
Construction of an interim segment from Yellowhead Trail in the west to 137 Avenue was the first to be completed, as part of St. Albert's Ray Gibbon Drive project.  Full work on the entire  of the northwest leg from Yellowhead Trail to Manning Drive (Highway 15) was initiated in early 2008 after Alberta's signing of a $1.42 billion P3 agreement with Northwestconnect General Partnership to build and maintain the road for 30 years.  Construction began in September 2008, described by then Premier Ed Stelmach as "an important step in meeting our provincial goal of completing the ring roads to a freeway status by 2015."  The project included the construction of two large interchanges, one each at Yellowhead Trail and Manning Drive. Seven other smaller interchanges were also constructed, as well as five flyovers and two rail crossings.  Three lanes each way were built from Yellowhead Trail to Campbell Road, and two lanes each way from Campbell Road to Manning Drive.  All work was completed on time, and the leg opened to traffic on November 1, 2011.

A sod turning ceremony was held on July 16 and construction was underway, at the time the largest transportation project in the history of the province. Significant reconstruction was done to the existing section of the road east of Edmonton from Yellowhead Trail south to Highway 14 that had been in place since at least the early 1960s. It was formerly known as Highway 14X, the "X" denoting that the route was an extension of Highway 14. Prior to the completion of Whitemud Drive at the end of the 1990s, Highway 14 followed a more northerly alignment through Edmonton on Sherwood Park Freeway.

As part of the reconstruction, several bridges constructed between 1965 and 1974 were demolished.  They spanned Anthony Henday Drive at Yellowhead Trail, Baseline Road and Sherwood Park Freeway and were removed to make way for updated structures that would allow the freeway underneath to be widened to six lanes and further expanded to eight lanes or more in the future.  A bridge built in 1969 carrying Broadmoor Boulevard over Yellowhead Trail was also demolished because it was not at the required elevation for the new interchange configuration.  Yellowhead Trail from the North Saskatchewan River to Clover Bar Road was significantly improved and widened, as was Sherwood Park Freeway from 17 Street to Ordze Road/Crescent in Sherwood Park.

Overall, the project included the construction of nine interchanges, two road flyovers, eight rail flyovers, and twin bridges over the North Saskatchewan River for a total of 47 bridge structures, and the demolition of 13 existing bridges.  An extensive environmental assessment was also completed which identified the need for a wildlife crossing at the river, which was constructed.  Noise analysis based on projected traffic volumes was also completed.  The complex interchange at Yellowhead Trail includes several braided ramps, connections to adjacent roads, and is bisected by a railway line. On October 1, 2016, the northeast leg of the freeway was officially opened to traffic.

Major construction on Sherwood Park Freeway and Yellowhead Trail was also largely complete including all new lanes and ramps.  Only minor aesthetic work remained such as landscaping, completion of mechanically stabilized earth walls, and painting of wing walls, piers, and abutments.

Future 
The entire freeway road was built with expansion in mind; almost all bridges were built wide enough for expansion to the ultimate stage which includes as many as six main travel lanes in one direction, depending on location.  In June 2018, Alberta committed $100 million to the widening of the southwest leg of the road.  The plans included widening both directions from two to three travel lanes in the congested southwest section between 111 Street and Whitemud Drive, and the more extensive work required to widen the bridges over the North Saskatchewan River and Wedgewood Ravine which are currently two lanes of travel per bridge each way.  In September 2019, Minister of Transportation Ric McIver announced that a contract for the work had been awarded, with work set to begin in fall 2019. Capacity of the section will be increased to 120,000 vehicles per day. In 2015, city councillor Michael Oshry had stated that he was unhappy with the way the road was initially constructed, and Alberta should have done a better job of anticipating the rapid growth in southwest Edmonton. Project manager Bill van der Meer disagreed, saying, "If we built a six-lane divided road that was virtually empty for 10 years, that wouldn't be money well spent."

As part of initial construction, grading has been completed for several future interchanges/flyovers and higher capacity directional ramps at existing interchanges, to reduce construction time and costs for those structures when traffic volumes require them.  For example, the directional ramps constructed at the northwest Henday/Yellowhead Trail interchange were built one lane wide initially, but all bridge decks are wide enough to accommodate a second lane.  Edmonton proposes to upgrade Terwillegar Drive to a freeway at an estimated cost of $1 billion, after which two directional ramps are proposed; they would carry traffic from northbound Terwillegar Drive to westbound Anthony Henday Drive, and from southbound to eastbound. On November 1, 2016, Alberta announced the intended closure of the right-in/right-out access at 127 Street in southwest Edmonton, citing safety concerns. However, in the following days, the city requested that the access remain open indefinitely until alternatives were explored, and the province agreed.  It was ultimately closed in May 2019, and a new right-in/right-out connection several hundred metres to the west opened at 135 Street in October 2019.  In the southeast, a directional ramp from eastbound Whitemud Drive to northbound Anthony Henday Drive is proposed, when traffic volumes warrant its construction.

To meet long-term requirements, Alberta Transportation also proposes to construct a high capacity directional ramp carrying traffic from eastbound Anthony Henday Drive to northbound Ray Gibbon Drive after the latter is twinned and upgraded to a freeway.  Ray Gibbon Drive is proposed as a major corridor that will carry the Highway 2 designation in the future.  One kilometre further down the road at 137 Avenue, grading was initially completed for a partial cloverleaf interchange but in 2008 Alberta elected not to spend $7 million to complete paving of the ramps because development did not yet require it. St. Albert mayor Nolan Crouse was unhappy with the decision, stating that his city would not pay for it either. "It's going to sit there until there's another plan, and right now we don't have a plan... we have taken the position that we think it's the province's responsibility, and they say they won't," Crouse said. , there is no timeline for completion of the interchange. Grading was also completed for a partial cloverleaf interchange at 50 Street in the northeast, but no timeline has been set for construction.

Alberta proposes to construct a second ring road around Edmonton to support future growth, approximately  beyond Anthony Henday Drive. The road would not be constructed for roughly 40 years, and could cost upwards of $11 billion. Parkland County mayor Rod Shaigec voiced his support for the plan in 2014, stating, "if we don't implement and have another ring road, it's going to be further traffic congestion and have environmental impacts as well." Edmonton mayor Don Iveson called the plan a bad idea, instead favouring expansion to Light Rail Transit and upgrades to existing roadways in the Edmonton area such as Yellowhead Trail. Both projects could be completed for the cost of the proposed outer ring road, he argued, and in 2016 the city announced that Yellowhead Trail would be upgraded to a freeway after the federal and provincial governments agreed to fund half of the $1 billion project.

Exit list 
Exit numbering begins at Calgary Trail and increases clockwise.

See also 

Stoney Trail
Circle Drive
Perimeter Highway
List of crossings of the North Saskatchewan River

Notes

References

External links 

Alberta Transportation - Edmonton Ring Road
Capital City Link Group - Northeast Anthony Henday Drive

Freeways in Alberta
Ring roads in Canada
Roads in Edmonton
Roads in St. Albert, Alberta
Roads in Strathcona County